Imatong State was a state in South Sudan that existed between 2 October 2015 and 22 February 2020. It was located in the Equatoria region and it bordered Yei River to the southwest, Jubek to the west, Terekeka and Jonglei to the northwest, Boma to the northeast, Namorunyang to the east, and Uganda to the south.

History

On 2 October 2015, President Salva Kiir issued a decree establishing 28 states in place of the 10 constitutionally established states. The decree established the new states largely along ethnic lines. A number of opposition parties and civil society groups challenged the constitutionality of the decree. Kiir later resolved to take it to parliament for approval as a constitutional amendment. In November the South Sudanese parliament empowered President Kiir to create new states.

Natisio Loluke was appointed Governor on 24 December.

Geography

Administrative divisions
After the split up, Imatong State broke down even further for a total of 12 counties in the state (created in April 2016). The 12 counties are part of the 180 counties in South Sudan. The 12 counties are consisted of the following:

 Former Ikotos County:
 Geria; headquarters: Locomo
 Ikwoto; headquarters: Ikwoto
 Kidepo Valley; headquarters: Chahari
 Former Lafon/Lopa County:
 Imehejek; headquarters: Imehejek
 Lafon; headquarters: Lafon
 Lopit West; headquarters: Longiro
 Former Magwi County
 Ayaci; headquarters: Ayaci
 Magwi; headquarters: Magwi
 Pageri; headquarters: Pageri
 Former Torit County:
 Torit; headquarters: Torit
 Torit East; headquarters: Hiyala
 Torit West; headquarters: Kudo

The counties are further sub-divided into payams, and the payams are then further sub-divided into bomas.

References

Equatoria
States of South Sudan